
Gmina Bledzew is a rural gmina (administrative district) in Międzyrzecz County, Lubusz Voivodeship, in western Poland.

Villages
Gmina Bledzew contains the villages and settlements of Bledzew, Bledzewka, Chycina, Dębowiec, Elektrownia, Goruńsko, Katarzynki, Kleszczewo, Kryl, Krzywokleszcz, Małoszewo, Nowa Wieś, Osada Rybacka, Osiecko, Pniewo, Popowo, Sokola Dąbrowa, Stary Dworek, Strużyny, Templewko, Templewo, Tymiana and Zemsko.

Neighbouring gminas
Gmina Bledzew is bordered by the gminas of Deszczno, Lubniewice, Międzyrzecz, Przytoczna, Skwierzyna and Sulęcin.

Twin towns – sister cities

Gmina Bledzew is twinned with:
 Podelzig, Germany

References

Bledzew
Międzyrzecz County